Kirklees was the site of a 12th-century Cistercian Priory north of Mirfield, in what is now West Yorkshire, in the metropolitan Borough of Calderdale, and is close to the current route of the M62 motorway. The priory no longer exists, although the name was reused in 1974 for the Metropolitan Borough of Kirklees.

In the 12th century, the Cistercian monks built Kirklees Priory. The former gatehouse can still be seen, though the site is on private land.  There is a legend about Robin Hood who was supposed to be the nephew of the prioress, who sheltered him when he was fleeing from the Sheriff of Nottingham, but bled him to death. There is still a "Robin Hood's Grave" on the local Ordnance Survey map.

The Jacobean Kirklees Hall was built in the late 16th century.

References

Geography of West Yorkshire